Myriokefala is a local community of the Rethymno Municipality in the  Rethymno (regional unit) of the region of Crete established by Kallikratis reform. Previously, it was part of municipality of Lappa. Capital of the new municipality is Rethymno.

Geography, origin of name, history 
It is located 33 kilometers southwest of Rethymno, on the northwestern outskirts of the Kryoneritis mountain (height 1228 m) in an altitude of 500 meters   with great view to the valley of Asi Gonia. Its name is due to the myriad (many) heads, i.e. hills, on which the village was built. Myriokefala is being occupied since the Venetian period.
Population of  Myriokefala

Attractions: Monuments, Temples, important buildings 

The Monastery of the Virgin, which dates back to the 10th century.

Transportation
There is bus service (KTEL) from/to Rethymno serving Myriokefala

See also
List of settlements in the Rethymno regional unit

External links 
Photo Gallery, Web site of municipality of Rethymno retrieved at 9 April 2012
Cycling routes, Web site of Tourism Promotion Committee of Rethymno Prefecture, retrieved at 9 April 2012

References

Populated places in Rethymno (regional unit)